Akkermansky Uyezd (Аккерманский уезд) was one of the subdivisions of the Bessarabia Governorate of the Russian Empire. It was situated in the southeastern part of the governorate. Its administrative centre was Bilhorod-Dnistrovskyi (Akkerman).

Demographics
At the time of the Russian Empire Census of 1897, Akkermansky Uyezd had a population of 265,247. Of these, 26.7% spoke Ukrainian, 21.3% Bulgarian, 16.4% Romanian, 16.4% German, 9.6% Russian, 4.6% Yiddish, 3.9% Gagauz or Turkish, 0.4% Romani, 0.2% Armenian, 0.1% French, 0.1% Polish and 0.1% Belarusian as their native language.

References

 
Uezds of Bessarabia Governorate
Bessarabia Governorate